Toowoomba Airport may refer to:

 Toowoomba City Aerodrome, a smaller older airport in Wilsonton
 Toowoomba Wellcamp Airport, a larger newer airport in Wellcamp